Maghirib Ans District is a district of the Dhamar Governorate, Yemen. As of 2003, the district had a population of 53,261 inhabitants.

References

Districts of Dhamar Governorate